Twenty-first Amendment to the Constitution of Pakistan (Urdu: آئین پاکستان میں اکیسویں ترمیم) was passed by both the National Assembly of Pakistan and Senate of Pakistan on January 6, 2015, and received the assent of the President on January 7, 2015. The Bill amended the Article 175 and the First Schedule of the Constitution. It also has a self-contained sunset clause, which causes the amendments to expire on January 7, 2017.

Background
The amendment established speedy trial military courts for terrorist offenses, waging war against Pakistan, and acts threatening the security of Pakistan. The duration of these courts is two years. The decision to amend the constitution came after the 2014 Peshawar school massacre.

Text

See also
Constitution of Pakistan
Amendments to the Constitution of Pakistan

References

External links
 Full-text of the Twenty-first Amendment

01